Skipper Jansson (Swedish: Skeppar Jansson) is a 1944 Swedish comedy film directed by and starring Sigurd Wallén and also featuring Douglas Håge, Artur Rolén and Dagmar Ebbesen. It was shot at the Sundbyberg Studios in Stockholm. The film's sets were designed by the art director Max Linder.

Synopsis
Jansson returns home after many years sailing the world. His two groups of relatives both want him to stay with them in hopes that he will leave them a large share of his inheritance.

Cast
 Sigurd Wallén as 	Jansson
 Douglas Håge as 	Nicklas
 Artur Rolén as 	August Sjöblom
 Dagmar Ebbesen as Mrs. Sjöblom
 Olof Bergström as 	Rune Sjöblom
 Arthur Fischer as Ernfrid Westerlund
 Gull Natorp as 	Mrs. Westerlund
 Margareta Fahlén as 	Maj Westerlund
 Gunnel Broström as Lilly
 Åke Uppström as 	Bengt
 Alice Skoglund as 	Aina
 Börje Mellvig as 	Vicar
 Tord Stål as 	Manager

References

Bibliography 
 Qvist, Per Olov & von Bagh, Peter. Guide to the Cinema of Sweden and Finland. Greenwood Publishing Group, 2000.

External links 
 

1944 films
Swedish comedy films
1944 comedy films
1940s Swedish-language films
Films directed by Sigurd Wallén
1940s Swedish films